Sir William Charles Windeyer (29 September 1834 – 11 September 1897) was an Australian politician and judge.

As a New South Wales politician he was responsible for the creation of Belmore Park (north of the new Central railway constructed in 1874 in Haymarket), Lang Park (in Church Hill, between York, Lang and Grosvenor Streets in the city), Observatory Park (on Flagstaff Hill in the west Rocks) and Cromwell Park at the head of Long Bay, Malabar and parks on Clark, Rodd, and Snapper Islands.  He was also the author of the New South Wales Patents Act and the Married Women's Property Act of 1879.

As a judge he was able, conscientious and hard-working, and had much knowledge of law. He had the misfortune to preside over two notorious cases, the Mount Rennie rape case and the Dean trials, which caused much popular feeling, and gave him the reputation in some quarters of being a "hanging" judge. His friends agreed that this estimate was far from his character, and that though he had a brusque exterior he was really a man of noble qualities. This estimate is in conformity with the fact that he was appointed president of the charities commission in 1873, and that he was responsible for the founding of the Discharged Prisoners Aid Society in 1874. An example of his courage and common sense is his judgment on the case dealing with the proceedings arising out of Annie Besant's pamphlet, The Law of Population, which was published separately in 1889 under the title, Ex Parte Collins.

Windeyer took much interest in education, was a trustee of the Sydney Grammar School, president of the Sydney Mechanics' School of Arts, and a trustee of the public library. He was Vice-Chancellor of the University of Sydney from 1883 to 1887 and Chancellor from 1895 to 1896.  He was also first chairman of the council of the women's college at the university. He was given the honorary degree of LL.D. by the University of Cambridge, and knighted in 1891.

Early life
Windeyer was the only child of Richard Windeyer and his wife, Maria Camfield; and was born in London. The family left London on the Medway arriving in Sydney on 28 November 1835. Windeyer the younger was 13 years of age when his father died. His mother, a woman of much character, was left practically without means, but with some help from friends managed to buy part of her husband's estate on the Hunter River, worked it, and made a success of wine growing.

Windeyer was educated at first at W. T. Cape's school, and then at The King's School, Parramatta. He was one of the first group to matriculate at the University of Sydney at the end of 1852, and during his course won a classical scholarship, and the prize for the English essay in each year. He graduated B.A. in 1856, M.A. in 1859, and was called to the bar in March 1857. He was law reporter for the Empire and then for a short time crown prosecutor in country districts.  In 1857, he married the daughter of the Rev. R. T. Bolton, Mary Elizabeth (1836-1912). Lady Windeyer took much interest in educational and social questions, particularly in regard to women, and was a prominent figure in the women's suffrage movement.

Political career

In 1859 Windeyer stood for the New South Wales Legislative Assembly seat of  Paddington and was defeated by 47 votes. He was, however, returned for the Lower Hunter at the same election. In 1860 he was returned for West Sydney, but afterwards resigned his seat on account of ill-health following the wrecking of the City of Sydney on which he was returning from Melbourne in after winning a rifle match. In 1866 he was again elected for West Sydney defeating Sir John Robertson.

On 16 December 1870 Windeyer became Solicitor General in the third Martin ministry and held this position until 13 May 1872, but was defeated at the election held in this year. In 1876 he was returned for the University of Sydney (beating Edmund Barton 49 votes to 43),  and from 22 March to 16 August 1877 was Attorney-General in the second Parkes ministry. In 1878 he obtained the assent of the house to the establishment of grammar schools at Bathurst, Goulburn and Maitland with exhibitions to enable students to proceed to the university. He was Attorney-General of New South Wales in the third Parkes ministry from 21 December 1878 to 10 August 1879.

Judge and educationalist
Windeyer was appointed as acting judge of the Supreme Court in August 1879. In August 1881 he became a puisne judge of the supreme court, and held this position for almost 15 years.  He believed strongly in the enforcement of the criminal law, particularly where the victims were women. In the Mount Rennie rape case, he sentenced nine young men to death for pack rape, and four were in fact hanged in 1887. Ian Barker  described the trial as being run in an oppressive manner, with the defence counsel not commencing their address to the jury until after midnight and that Windeyer was biased against the accused. In 1895 Windeyer caused controversy by imposing the death penalty on George Dean for attempting to poison his wife.  There was a strong belief that Dean was innocent and that his wife and her mother (who was a woman of ill repute) had conspired against him.  Although, Dean was very likely guilty, his death sentence was commuted and he was later released on a free pardon.  He was subsequently convicted of perjury and spent nine years in jail.  Windeyer resigned on 31 August 1896, prior to his trip to Europe.

Death
On his way to Europe Windeyer  accepted a temporary judicial appointment in Newfoundland, but died suddenly while at Bologna, Italy. He was survived by his wife, five daughters and three sons (including Richard and William). Of Windeyer's sons, Richard, born in 1868, followed his father's profession, became a KC and for a time was an acting-judge of the supreme court of New South Wales; William Archibald Windeyer, born in 1871, was also well known in Sydney as a solicitor and public man. His daughter Margaret was a librarian and women's rights campaigner.

References

 

1834 births
1897 deaths
Australian Knights Bachelor
Judges of the Supreme Court of New South Wales
Members of the New South Wales Legislative Assembly
University of Sydney alumni
Attorneys General of the Colony of New South Wales
Solicitors General for New South Wales
Colony of New South Wales judges
19th-century Australian politicians
Chancellors of the University of Sydney
19th-century Australian judges
British emigrants to colonial Australia